Sara Raza Khan  also known as Sara Raza, is a Pakistani singer who started her singing career on the television program Sa Re Ga Ma Pa Challenge 2009. She is the winner of the Pakistani reality show Bright Star. She also participated in the talent program Sur Kshetra. In 2013, she won Hum Award for Best Original Soundtrack for Mere Qatil Mere Dildar.

Discography

Other songs

Film songs

Television songs

Reality shows

References

External links 
 Sara Raza Khan on YouTube

Living people
Pakistani women singers
Pakistani ghazal singers
Sa Re Ga Ma Pa participants
Kinnaird College for Women University alumni
Hum Award winners
Coke Studio (Pakistani TV program)
Women ghazal singers
Year of birth missing (living people)